Events from the year 1320 in Ireland.

Incumbent
Lord: Edward II

Events
 The "Medieval University of Dublin" founded

Births
 John Colton, Archbishop of Armagh

Deaths

 
1320s in Ireland
Ireland
Years of the 14th century in Ireland